is a passenger railway station located in the city of Imabari, Ehime Prefecture, Japan. It is operated by JR Shikoku and has the station number "Y41".

Lines
Hashihama Station is served by the JR Shikoku Yosan Line and is located 149.6 km from the beginning of the line at Takamatsu Station. Connections with other local or limited express trains are needed to travel further east or west along the line.

Layout
The station consists of two opposed side platforms serving two tracks. Line 1 is a straight track while line 2 is a passing siding. The station building, linked to platform/track 1, is unstaffed and serves only as a waiting room. Access to platform 2, which also has a weather shelter, is by means of a footbridge. Parking is available at the station forecourt. There is also a designated parking area for bicycles but no shed. A siding branches off line 2.

Adjacent stations

History
At that time the station was operated by Japanese Government Railways, later becoming Japanese National Railways (JNR). With the privatization of JNR on 1 April 1987, control of the station passed to JR Shikoku.

Surrounding area
Hashihama Kosan Driving School
Japan National Route 317

See also
 List of railway stations in Japan

References

External links

Station timetable

Railway stations in Ehime Prefecture
Railway stations in Japan opened in 1924
Imabari, Ehime